Charles Blount may refer to:

 Charles Blount, 5th Baron Mountjoy (1516–1544), English courtier and patron of learning
 Charles Blount, 1st Earl of Devon (1563–1606), English courtier and soldier
 Sir Charles Blount (1568–1600), English soldier, son of Michael Blount
 Charles Blount (deist) (1654–1693), British author and activist
 Air Vice-Marshal Charles Hubert Boulby Blount (1893–1940), RAF officer and cricketer

See also
 Charles Blunt (disambiguation)
Blount (surname)